Diogenesia is a genus of flowering plants belonging to the family Ericaceae.

Its native range is Western South America to Venezuela.

Species:

Diogenesia alstoniana 
Diogenesia amplectens 
Diogenesia andina 
Diogenesia antioquiensis 
Diogenesia boliviana 
Diogenesia caudata 
Diogenesia floribunda 
Diogenesia gracilipes 
Diogenesia laxa 
Diogenesia octandra 
Diogenesia oligantha 
Diogenesia racemosa 
Diogenesia tetrandra 
Diogenesia vargasiana

References

Ericaceae
Ericaceae genera
Taxa named by Hermann Otto Sleumer